Ozerne (until 1949 Haylivka (Хайлівка), from 1949 to 2016 Illichivka (Іллічівка)) is a village in Bakhmut Raion (district) in Donetsk Oblast of eastern Ukraine, at about  north by east from the centre of Donetsk city. It belongs to Lyman urban hromada, one of the hromadas of Ukraine.

The village was recaptured from Russian forces in September 2022, during the Russian invasion of Ukraine.

References

Villages in Kramatorsk Raion